The reception of Hinduism in the Western world begins in the 19th century, at first at an academic level of religious studies and antiquarian interest in Sanskrit.
Only after World War II does Hinduism acquire a presence as a religious minority in western nations, partly due to immigration, and partly due to conversion, the latter especially in the context of the 1960s to 1970s counter-culture, giving rise to a number of Hinduism-inspired new religious movements sometimes also known as "Neo-Hindu" or "export Hinduism".

History

Colonial period

During the British colonial period the British substantially influenced Indian society, but India also influenced the western world. An early champion of Indian-inspired thought in the West was Arthur Schopenhauer who in the 1850s advocated ethics based on an  "Aryan-Vedic theme of spiritual self-conquest", as opposed to the ignorant drive toward earthly utopianism of the superficially this-worldly "Jewish" spirit. Helena Blavatsky moved to India in 1879, and her Theosophical Society, founded in New York in 1875, evolved into a peculiar mixture of Western occultism and Hindu mysticism over the last years of her life.

The sojourn of Vivekananda to the World Parliament of Religions in Chicago in 1893 had a lasting effect. Vivekananda founded the Ramakrishna Mission, an Indian religious missionary organization still active today.

Hinduism-inspired elements in Theosophy were also inherited by the spin-off movements of Ariosophy and Anthroposophy and ultimately contributed to the renewed New Age boom of the 1960s to 1980s, the term New Age itself deriving from Blavatsky's 1888  The Secret Doctrine.

In the early 20th century, Western occultists influenced by Hinduism include Maximiani Portaz – an advocate of "Aryan Paganism" – who styled herself Savitri Devi and Jakob Wilhelm Hauer, founder of the German Faith Movement. It was in this period, and until the 1920s, that the swastika became a ubiquitous symbol of good luck in the West before its association with the Nazi Party became dominant in the 1930s. In 1920, Yogananda came to the United States as India's delegate to an International Congress of Religious Liberals convening in Boston; the same year he founded the Self-Realization Fellowship (SRF) to disseminate worldwide his teachings on India's ancient practices and philosophy of Yoga and its tradition of meditation. In unrelated developments, during the same time Jiddu Krishnamurti, a South Indian Brahmin, was promoted as the "vehicle" of the messianic entity Maitreya, the so-called World Teacher, by the Theosophical Society.

Another early Hindu teacher received in the west was Sri Aurobindo (d. 1950), who had considerable influence on western  "integral"  esotericism, traditionalism ("Perennialism") or spirituality in the tradition of René Guénon, Julius Evola, Rudolf Steiner, etc.

Neo-Hindu movements 1950s–1980s

During the 1960s to 1970s counter-culture, Sathya Sai Baba (Sathya Sai Organization), A.C. Bhaktivedanta Swami Prabhupada (ISKCON or "Hare Krishna"), Guru Maharaj Ji (Divine Light Mission)  and Maharishi Mahesh Yogi (Transcendental Meditation movement) attracted a notable western following, founding religious or quasi-religious movements that remain active into the present time.  This group of movements founded by charismatic persons with a corpus of esoteric writings, predominantly in English, is classed as founding, proselytizing religions, or "guru-ism" by Michaels (1998).

Hatha Yoga was popularized from the 1960s by B.K.S. Iyengar, K. Pattabhi Jois and others. However, western practice of Yoga has mostly become detached from its religious or mystic context and is predominantly practiced as exercise or as alternative medicine.

Since the 1980s, Mata Amritanandamayi and Mother Meera (the "Divine Mother", self-identifying as an avatar of Shakti) have been active in the west.

Hindu migration to Western countries

Substantial emigration from the (predominantly Hindu) Republic of India has taken place since the 1970s, with several million Hindus from Islamic Republic of Pakistan & People's Republic of Bangladesh moving to North America and Western Europe fleeing religious persecution. In 1913, A.K. Mozumdar became the first Indian-born person to earn U.S. citizenship.

The largest immigrant (Deshi) Hindu communities in the west are found in the United States (3.23 million), the United Kingdom (0.84 million), Canada (0.50 million), Australia (0.44 million), New Zealand (0.09 million), besides smaller communities in other countries of Western Europe, (Netherlands 0.21 M, Italy 0.18 M, France 0.12 M, Germany 0.1 M, Spain 0.03 M and Switzerland 0.03 M).
Much of the Hindu presence in Canada is due to the Tamil diaspora as a result of the Sri Lankan civil war, as well as Gujarati and Punjabi immigrants from India - along with a small Hindu community from the Caribbean.

Hinduism-derived elements in popular culture

Growing out of the enthusiasm for Hinduism in 1960s counterculture, modern western popular culture has adopted certain elements ultimately based in Hinduism which are not now considered necessarily practiced in a religious or spiritual setting. It is estimated that around 30 million Americans and 5 million Europeans regularly practice some form of Hatha Yoga, mainly as exercise. In Australia, the number of practitioners is about 300,000. In New Zealand, the number is also around 300,000.

Author Kathleen Hefferon comments that "In the West, a more modernized "New Age" version of Ayurveda has recently gained popularity as a unique form of complementary and alternative medicine".

"Vegetarianism, nonviolent ethics, yoga, and meditation—all have enjoyed spates of Occidental popularity in the last 40 years, often influenced by ISKCON directly, if not indirectly."

See also

Hindu reform movements
Sanskrit in the West
Esotericism in Germany and Austria
Ramakrishna's impact
Neo-Advaita
Californian Hindu textbook controversy
:Category:Converts to Hinduism
Hindu denominations
Hindu Temple Society of North America, Flushing
Hinduism in Australia
Hinduism in Canada
Hinduism in Europe
Hinduism in New Zealand
Hinduism in the United Kingdom
Hinduism in the United States
Indians in the New York City metropolitan area
Invading the Sacred
List of Hindu temples in the United States

Organizations
Hindu University of America
Parliament of the World's Religions 
Hindu American Foundation
United States India Political Action Committee (USINPAC)

References

 
 
Neo-Vedanta